Caloptilia semifasciella is a moth of the family Gracillariidae. It is known from the islands of Hokkaidō, Honshū and Kyūshū in Japan.

The wingspan is 11–12 mm.

The larvae feed on Acer crataegifolium, Acer distylum, Acer micranthum, Acer rufinerve and Acer tschonoskii. They probably mine the leaves of their host plant.

References

semifasciella
Moths of Japan
Moths described in 1966